Eosiopsis is a genus of stalk-eyed flies in the family Diopsidae.

Species
E. orientalis (Ôuchi, 1942)
E. pumila (Yang & Chen, 1998)
E. sinensis (Ôuchi, 1942)

References

Diopsidae
Diopsoidea genera
Diptera of Asia